De Dee Hame Azaadi (Miraculously given us freedom) or Sabarmati ke Sant is an Indian song written by Kavi Pradeep. It is a patriotic song dedicated to Mahatma Gandhi and his non-violence nature. This a film soundtrack of Bollywood film Jagriti (1954). This song was sung by Asha Bhosle.

See also
 List of artistic depictions of Mahatma Gandhi

References

1954 songs
Indian patriotic songs
Hindi songs
Asha Bhosle songs
Works about Mahatma Gandhi
Cultural depictions of Mahatma Gandhi